How Sweet It Is may refer to:

In music:
 "How Sweet It Is (To Be Loved by You)", a 1964 song by Marvin Gaye, covered by many artists
 How Sweet It Is (Jerry Garcia Band album), 1997
 How Sweet It Is (Joan Osborne album), 2002
 "How Sweet It Is", a song by Michael Paynter

In other uses:
 How Sweet It Is!, a 1968 film starring James Garner and Debbie Reynolds
 How Sweet It Is (2013 film), a film starring Joe Piscopo
 "How sweet it is!", a catchphrase used by Jackie Gleason
 How Sweet It Is!: From the Cotton Mill to the Crows' Nest, an autobiography by Bob Harris
 How Sweet It Is, a sweetcorn variety